Conus advertex is a species of sea snail, a marine gastropod mollusk in the family Conidae, the cone snails, cone shells or cones.

These snails are predatory and venomous. They are capable of "stinging" humans, therefore live ones should be handled carefully or not at all.

Description
The size of the shell varies between 27 mm and 46 mm.

Distribution
This marine species of cone snail is endemic to Australia (New South Wales, Queensland).

References

 Garrard, T.A. 1961. Mollusca collected by M. V. "Challenger" off the east coast of Australia. Journal of the Malacological Society of Australia 5: 3-38
 Wilson, B. (1994) Australian marine shells. Prosobranch gastropods. Vol. 2 Neogastropods. Odyssey Publishing, Kallaroo, Western Australia, 370 pp.
 Filmer R.M. (2001). A Catalogue of Nomenclature and Taxonomy in the Living Conidae 1758 - 1998. Backhuys Publishers, Leiden. 388pp
 Puillandre N., Duda T.F., Meyer C., Olivera B.M. & Bouchet P. (2015). One, four or 100 genera? A new classification of the cone snails. Journal of Molluscan Studies. 81: 1-23

External links
 To World Register of Marine Species
 Cone Shells - Knights of the Sea
 

advertex
Gastropods described in 1961